Adam Marsh (born 20 February 1982) is an English former professional footballer who played in The Football League for Darlington.

References

1982 births
Living people
Footballers from Derby
Association football midfielders
English footballers
Worksop Town F.C. players
Darlington F.C. players
Whitby Town F.C. players
Hampton & Richmond Borough F.C. players
English Football League players